Robert Haberman was an American socialist lawyer and activist who lived most of his life in Mexico City and Yucatán working as the head of the Foreign Language Department of the Ministry of Education. Of Romanian Jewish origin, he helped introduce important socialist reforms to the Yucatán Peninsula.

References 
 

American socialists
American emigrants to Mexico
Jewish socialists
Mexican Jews
Mexican people of Romanian-Jewish descent
Mexican socialists
American people of Romanian-Jewish descent
Naturalized citizens of Mexico
People from Mexico City
Year of birth missing
Year of death missing